A solar term (or jieqi) is any of twenty-four periods in traditional Chinese lunisolar calendars that matches a particular astronomical event or signifies some natural phenomenon. The points are spaced 15° apart along the ecliptic and are used by lunisolar calendars to stay synchronized with the seasons, which is crucial for agrarian societies. The solar terms are also used to calculate intercalary months; which month is repeated depends on the position of the sun at the time.

According to the Book of Documents, the first determined term was Dongzhi (Winter Solstice) by Dan, the Duke of Zhou, while he was trying to locate the geological center of the Western Zhou dynasty, by measuring the length of the sun's shadow on an ancient type of sundial called  (). Then four terms of seasons were set, which were soon evolved as eight terms; until 104 BC in the book Taichu Calendar, the entire twenty-four solar terms were officially included in the Chinese calendar.

Because the Sun's speed along the ecliptic varies depending on the Earth-Sun distance, the number of days that it takes the Sun to travel between each pair of solar terms varies slightly throughout the year. Each solar term is divided into three , so there are 72 pentads in a year. Each pentad consists of five, rarely six, days, and are mostly named after phenological (biological or botanical) phenomena corresponding to the pentad.

Solar terms originated in China, then spread to Korea, Vietnam, and Japan, countries in the East Asian cultural sphere. Although each term was named based on the seasonal changes of climate in the North China Plain, peoples living in the different climates still use it without changes. This is exhibited by the fact that traditional Chinese characters for most of the solar terms are identical.

On December 1, 2016, the solar terms were listed by UNESCO as an Intangible Cultural Heritage.

Numbering 
The even solar terms (marked with "Z", for ) are considered the major terms, while the odd solar terms (marked with "J", for ) are deemed minor. The year starts with Lichun (J1) and ends with Dahan (Z12).

Multilingual list

Chinese mnemonic song 
The "Song of Solar Terms" is used to ease the memorization of jiéqì:

Traditional Chinese

Simplified Chinese

Pinyin

The first four lines provides a concise version of the names of the 24 jieqi. The last four lines provide some rules of thumb about the Gregorian dates of jieqi, namely:
 Two jieqi per month;
 Gregorian dates are off by one or two days at most;
 In the first half of the year, jieqi happens around the 6th and 21st day of each (Gregorian) month;
 In the second half of the year, jieqi happens around the 8th and 23rd day of each (Gregorian) month.

Determination 

Under this method, the determination of solar terms is similar to the astronomical determination of the special cases of equinox and solstice dates, with different ecliptic longitudes to solve for. One can start with an approximation and then perform a correction using the anomalies and mean motion of the sun. The JPL Horizons On-Line Ephemeris System may be used to query for exact times of solar terms.

Regional note 
The name of each solar term also refers to the period of time between that day and the next solar term, or 1/24th of a year.

See also 
 Chinese calendar
 Korean calendar
 Japanese calendar
 Vietnamese calendar

References

External links 
 24 Solar Terms calculator
 24 Solar Terms – Hong Kong Observatory
Twenty Four Solar Terms and Their Customs in China
 Chinese calendar with upcoming solar terms in current year
 24 Sekki – NAOJ > ECO > Glossary >
 Twenty-four Solar Terms and meaning
 Date and time of Solar Terms
 The 24 Solar Terms

 
Intangible Cultural Heritage of Humanity